Mary Dorcey (born 1950), an elected member of the Aosdana (Irish Academy of Writers and Artists), is a poet, novelist, short story writer, feminist and LGBTQIA+ activist. She was a writer in residence at Trinity College Dublin 1995/2005 and at the Women's Education, Research and Resource Centre of University College Dublin. She has been described as a lyric poet who celebrates the life of the emotions and senses. She describes her fiction work as exploring the intimate space between social structures and individual imagination. Clodagh Corcoran in The Irish Times described her novel Biography of Desire as "arguably the first truly erotic Irish novel."

Biography
Dorcey was born in County Dublin, Ireland, in 1950. She attended Paris Diderot University in Paris, France, and then Open University. She is a research associate at Trinity College Dublin, where for ten years, she was a writer in residence at the Centre for Gender and Women's Studies. During this time, she conducted seminars on contemporary English literature and led a creative writing workshop. She also taught in the School for Justice at University College Dublin.

She has published seven poetry collections, one novel, one group of short stories, and one novella. "Life Holds Its Breath", her latest collection, was published in 2022 by Salmon Poetry and reviewed in The Irish Times by Seán Hewitt as "moving, surprising, full of sun-dappled desire and refreshingly fluid evocation." Her collection, "New and Selected Poems", was published by Salmon Poetry in 2017.

Dorcey is recognized as a pioneer of the gay and lesbian rights movement in Ireland. She came out in 1974. She was a founder of Irish Women United, Women for Radical Change and The Movement for Sexual Liberation. She has lived and worked in the United States, England, France, Spain, and Japan.

Recognition
Dorcey's poetry and fiction are taught internationally at universities throughout Europe, the United States, Britain, Canada, Africa and China. Her poems are studied on the English curriculum for the Irish Junior Certificate and British O Levels. 'First Love' was selected for the revised Junior Cycle and included in the BBC anthology, 'A Hundred Favourite Poems of Childhood.' Her work has attracted international research and has been the subject of academic essays and critiques. It has been reproduced in more than one hundred anthologies representing Irish, gay and women's literature. Her poems have been performed on radio and television stations, such as BBC, RTÉ and Channel 4. Her stories have been dramatized for radio and stage productions in Ireland, the United Kingdom and Australia.

Dorcey won the Rooney Prize for Irish Literature for her short story collection A Noise from the Woodshed  in 1990. In 2010 Aosdána awarded her the honorary Irish Academy of Arts and Letters. Poet Nuala Ní Dhomhnaill and novelist Eugene McCabe nominated her. She has won five major awards for literature from the Arts Council of Ireland in 1990, 1995, 1999, 2005 and 2008.

Her poetry and fiction explore issues of sexuality, identity and the multifaceted lives of women through their roles as mothers, daughters, and lovers. Her themes include the cathartic role of the outsider, political injustice and the nature of the erotic power to subvert and transfigure. She has won popular and international critical acclaim for portraying romantic and erotic relationships between women and her subversive and tender view of the mother/daughter dynamic.

Bibliography

Poetry
 Kindling (London, Onlywomen Press, 1989)
 Moving into The Space Cleared by our Mothers (Salmon Poetry, 1991)
 The River That Carries Me (Salmon Poetry 1995)
 Like Joy in Season, Like Sorrow. (Salmon Poetry, 2001)
 Perhaps the heart is Constant After All. (Salmon Poetry, 2012)
  "To Air the Soul, Throw All the Windows Wide." (Salmon Poetry 2016) New and Selected Poetry.
 "Life Holds Its Breath. (Salmon Poetry 2022.)

Books, essays and short stories
 A Noise from the Woodshed: Short Stories (London, Onlywomen Press, 1989)
 Scarlet O'Hara (in the anthology In and Out of Time) (London. Onlywomen Press, 1990)
 Biography of Desire (Dublin, Poolbeg 1997)
 A Glorious Day (The Faber Book Of Best New Irish Short Stories 2006–2007 By David Marcus)
 The Lift Home (Virgins and Hyacinths, Ed. Caroline Walsh.1993.)
 The Orphan; (In Sunshine or in Shadow) Ed. Mary Maher. 1999.
 " The Fate of Aoife and the Children of Lir" Feminist Faery Tales. ed. Maeve Binchy. 
 "Adrienne." 'Queer Whispers' anthology ed. Paul McVeigh.

Staged dramatisations
 In the Pink (The Raving Beauties)
 Sunny Side Plucked (Dublin, Project Arts Centre)

See also
 Lesbian Poetry

References

Further reading
 

1950 births
Living people
Aosdána members
Irish women short story writers
Irish women poets
Lesbian poets
Irish LGBT novelists
20th-century Irish novelists
21st-century Irish novelists
Lesbian novelists
Irish women novelists
20th-century Irish women writers
21st-century Irish women writers
20th-century Irish short story writers
21st-century Irish short story writers
Alumni of the Open University
20th-century Irish poets
21st-century Irish poets